This article presents a list of the historical events and publications of Australian literature during 1929.

Books 
 Arthur H. Adams – A Man's Life
 Martin Boyd – Dearest Idol
 Bernard Cronin – Toad
 Jean Devanny – Riven
 M. Barnard Eldershaw – A House is Built
 Arthur Gask – The Lonely House
 Mary Gaunt – The Lawless Frontier
 Norman Lindsay –  Madam Life's Lovers : A Human Narrative Embodying a Philosophy of the Artist in Dialogue Form
 Jack McLaren – A Diver Went Down
 Frederic Manning – The Middle Parts of Fortune : Somme and Ancre, 1916
 Myra Morris – Enchantment
 Katharine Susannah Prichard - Coonardoo
 Henry Handel Richardson – Ultima Thule
 Alice Grant Rosman – Visitors to Hugo
 Arthur W. Upfield – The Barrakee Mystery

Short stories 
 Dulcie Deamer – As It Was in the Beginning
 Vance Palmer
 "Ancestors"
 "Jettisoned"
 Henry Handel Richardson – "The Bath"
 David Unaipon – Native Legends

Children's and Young Adult fiction 
 Mary Grant Bruce – The Happy Traveller
 May Gibbs – Bib and Bub in Gumnut Town
 Lilian Turner – Lady Billie

Poetry 

 Ruth Bedford – Fairies and Fancies
 Furnley Maurice – The Gully and Other Verses
 Myra Morris – White Magic
 John Shaw Neilson – "The Whistling Jack"
 Kenneth Slessor
 "Cucumber Kitty"
 "Snowdrops"

Drama
 Betty Roland – Morning

Non-fiction 
 Alec H. Chisholm – Birds and Green Places : A Book of Australian Nature Gossip

Awards and honours

Literary

Births 

A list, ordered by date of birth (and, if the date is either unspecified or repeated, ordered alphabetically by surname) of births in 1929 of Australian literary figures, authors of written works or literature-related individuals follows, including year of death.

 5 January – Veronica Brady, poet and critic (died 2015)
 1 February – R. A. Simpson, poet (died 2002)
 16 February – Peter Porter, poet (died 2010)
26 March – David Lake, science fiction novelist (died 2016)
 2 April – Catherine Gaskin, novelist (died 2009)
 14 April – Ray Mathew, novelist, poet and dramatist (died 2002)
 5 May – Kenneth Cook, novelist (died 1987)
 11 December – Desmond O'Grady, novelist and short story writer (died 2021)

Deaths 

A list, ordered by date of death (and, if the date is either unspecified or repeated, ordered alphabetically by surname) of deaths in 1929 of Australian literary figures, authors of written works or literature-related individuals follows, including year of birth.

 27 February — Lala Fisher, poet, writer and editor (born 1872)
 28 May – Barbara Baynton, novelist and short story writer (born 1857)
8 June – Laura Palmer-Archer, short story writer, wrote as Bushwoman (born 1864)

See also 
 1929 in poetry
 1929 in literature
 List of years in literature
 List of years in Australian literature
1929 in literature
1928 in Australian literature
1929 in Australia
1930 in Australian literature

References

Literature
Australian literature by year
20th-century Australian literature